
Year 243 (CCXLIII) was a common year starting on Sunday (link will display the full calendar) of the Julian calendar. At the time, it was known as the Year of the Consulship of Arrianus and Papus (or, less frequently, year 996 Ab urbe condita). The denomination 243 for this year has been used since the early medieval period, when the Anno Domini calendar era became the prevalent method in Europe for naming years.

Events 
 By place 
 Roman Empire 
 Battle of Resaena: A Roman army under Timesitheus defeats the Sassanids at Resaena (mdern Syria);  King Shapur I is forced to flee to the Euphrates.
 Timesitheus becomes ill and dies under suspicious circumstances. Shapur I retreats to the Sassanid Empire, giving up all the territories he has conquered.
 Emperor Gordian III appoints Philip the Arab as his new praetorian prefect (after the death of Timesitheus) and proceeds with his campaign in Mesopotamia.
 Cohors I Ubiorum, the garrison at Capidava in Scythia Minor, is replaced by Cohors I Germanorum Civium Romanorum, until the end of the 3rd century AD.

 Asia 
 Fan Chan of Funan sends a tribute mission to China (approximate date).

Births 
 Sun Hao, Chinese emperor of the Eastern Wu state (d. 284)
 Sun Liang, Chinese emperor of the Eastern Wu state (d. 260)

Deaths 
 Gu Yong (or Yuantan), Chinese official and politician (b. 168)
 Hu Zong (or Weize), Chinese official and general (b. 183)
 Timesitheus, Roman advisor and praetorian prefect (b. 190)
 Xue Zong (or Jingwen), Chinese official, politician and poet

References